Merfyn Frych ('Merfyn the Freckled'; Old Welsh Mermin), also known as Merfyn ap Gwriad ('Merfyn son of Gwriad') and Merfyn Camwri ('Merfyn the Oppressor'), was King of Gwynedd from around 825 to 844, the first of its kings known not to have descended from the male line of King Cunedda.

Little is known of his reign, and his primary notability is as the father of Rhodri the Great and founder of his dynasty, which was sometimes called the Merfynion after him. Merfyn came to the throne in the aftermath of a bloody dynastic struggle between two rivals named Cynan and Hywel  generally identified with the sons of Rhodri Molwynog.

The Annales Cambriae say Merfyn died around 844, the same year in which a battle occurred at Cetyll, but it is unclear whether those were two unrelated events or he fell in battle.

Political background 

The times leading up to Merfyn's reign were unsettled for both Gwynedd and neighbouring Powys. Both kingdoms were beset by internal dynastic strife, external pressure from Mercia, and bad luck with nature. In 810, there was a bovine plague that killed many cattle (the primary form of wealth at the time) throughout Wales. The next year, the ancient wooden llys at Deganwy was struck by lightning. A destructive war for control of Gwynedd raged between 812 and 816, while in Powys a son of the king was killed by his brother "through treachery". In 818, there was a notable battle at Llanfaes on Anglesey. Although our sources do not identify the combatants, the site had been the llys of King Cynan.

Coenwulf of Mercia took advantage of the situation in 817, occupying Rhufoniog (see map) and laying waste to the mountains of Snowdonia. Coastal Wales along the Dee Estuary must have remained under Mercia’s control through 821, as Coenwulf is recorded dying peacefully at Basingwerk in that year. In 823, Mercia laid waste to Powys and returned to Gwynedd to burn Deganwy to the ground. Gwynedd and Powys then gained a respite when Mercia's attention turned elsewhere and its fortunes waned. King Beornwulf was killed fighting the East Anglians in 826, his successor Ludeca suffered the same fate the following year, and Mercia was conquered and occupied by Ecgberht of Wessex in 829. Though Mercia managed to throw off Ecgberht's rule in 830, it was thereafter beset by dynastic strife and never regained its former dominance, either in Wales or eastern England.

Family background and marriage

Merfyn was linked to the earlier dynasty through his mother Esyllt, the daughter of King Cynan (d. after 816), rather than through his father Gwriad ap Elidyr. As his father's origins are obscure, so is the basis of his claim to the throne.

Extremely little is known of Merfyn's father Gwriad. Merfyn claimed descent from Llywarch Hen through him, and the royal pedigree in Jesus College MS. 20 says that Gwriad was the son of Elidyr, who bears the same name as his ancestor, the father of Llywarch Hen, Elidyr lydanwyn. Supporting the veracity of the pedigree is an entry in the Annales Cambriae, which states that Gwriad, the brother of Rhodri the Great, was slain on Anglesey by the Saxons. That is to say, Merfyn named one of his sons after his father Gwriad.

The discovery of a cross inscribed Crux Guriat on the Isle of Man and dated to the 8th or 9th century raised the question of whether Gwriad's possible connection to "Manaw" was to Manaw Gododdin, once active in North Britain, or to the Isle of Man. John Rhys suggested that Gwriad might well have taken refuge on the Isle of Man during the bloody dynastic struggle between Cynan and Hywel prior to Merfyn's accession to the throne, and that the cross perhaps does refer to the refugee Gwriad, father of Merfyn. He goes on to note that the Welsh Triads mention a 'Gwryat son of Gwryan in the North'. Other locations for "Manaw" have been suggested, including Ireland, Galloway and Powys.

While Rhys's suggestion is not implausible, his reference to Gwriad's father Gwrian contradicts the royal pedigree, which says that Gwriad's father was Elidir, so this may be a confusion of two different people named Gwriad. Gwriad's name does appear with northern origins in the Welsh Triads as one of the "Three kings, who were of the sons of strangers" (sometimes referred to as the "Three Peasant Kings"), where he is identified as the son of "Gwrian in the North".

Merfyn allied his own royal family with that of Powys by marrying Nest, daughter or sister of King Cadell ap Brochfael, of the Royal House of Gwertherion.

Reign
Precious little is known of Merfyn's reign. Thornton suggests that Merfyn was probably among the Welsh kings who were defeated by Ecgberht, king of Wessex, in the year 830, but it is unknown how this affected Merfyn's rule.

Merfyn is mentioned as a king of the Britons in a copyist's addition to the Historia Brittonum and in the Bamberg Cryptogram, but as both sources are traced to people working in Merfyn's own court during his reign, it should not be considered more significant than someone's respectful reference to his patron while working in his service.

In the literary sources, Merfyn's name appears in the Dialogue between Myrddin and his sister Gwenddydd, found in the mid-13th-century manuscript known as the Red Book of Hergest. The dialogue is a prophecy of the future kings, and lists among them Merfyn in the passage "meruin vrych o dir manaw".

Children
 Rhodri the Great
 Gwriad
 Anarawd ap Merfyn

See also
 List of rulers of Gwynedd
 Kings of Wales family trees

Notes

References

Sources

Further reading

844 deaths
Monarchs of Gwynedd
Year of birth unknown
9th-century Welsh monarchs